Giancarlo Centi (born May 14, 1959, in L'Aquila) is an Italian professional football coach and a former player.

Centi played in Inter Milan's youth and senior sides, winning the 1981–82 Coppa Italia during his stay.

References

1959 births
Living people
People from L'Aquila
Italian footballers
Serie A players
Serie B players
Como 1907 players
Inter Milan players
U.S. Avellino 1912 players
Pro Sulmona Calcio 1921 players
Italian football managers
Como 1907 managers
Association football midfielders
Sportspeople from the Province of L'Aquila
Footballers from Abruzzo